Bohumil Kudrna (15 March 1920 – 11 February 1991) was a Czechoslovak flatwater and slalom canoeist who competed in the late 1940s and the early 1950s. Competing in two Summer Olympics,  he won two medals with Jan Brzák-Felix in the C-2 1000 m event with a gold in 1948  and a silver in 1952.

Kudrna won two gold medals at the 1950 ICF Canoe Sprint World Championships in Copenhagen, earning them in the C-2 1000 m and C-2 10000 m events.

He also won two medals at the 1949 ICF Canoe Slalom World Championships in Geneva with a silver in the C-2 team event and a bronze in the C-2 event.

References
DatabaseOlympics.com profile

1920 births
1991 deaths
Canoeists at the 1948 Summer Olympics
Canoeists at the 1952 Summer Olympics
Czech male canoeists
Czechoslovak male canoeists
Olympic canoeists of Czechoslovakia
Olympic gold medalists for Czechoslovakia
Olympic silver medalists for Czechoslovakia
Olympic medalists in canoeing
ICF Canoe Sprint World Championships medalists in Canadian
Medalists at the 1952 Summer Olympics
Medalists at the 1948 Summer Olympics
Medalists at the ICF Canoe Slalom World Championships